The Croatian Amateur Radio Association (HRS) is a national non-profit organization for amateur radio enthusiasts in Croatia.  Key membership benefits of HRS include the sponsorship of amateur radio operating awards and radio contests.  HRS also supports local competitions in Amateur Radio Direction Finding as well as a national team that travels to regional and world championship events.  HRS has been the sponsoring organization for the 2010 Amateur Radio Direction Finding World Championships held in Dubrovnik.  HRS represents the interests of Croatian amateur radio operators before Croatian and international telecommunications regulatory authorities.  HRS is the national member society representing Croatia in the International Amateur Radio Union.

See also 
International Amateur Radio Union

References 

International Amateur Radio Union member societies
Clubs and societies in Croatia
1992 establishments in Croatia
Organizations established in 1992
Radio in Croatia
Organizations based in Zagreb